The short-tailed hopping mouse (Notomys amplus) is an extinct species of mouse from open stony (gibber) plains with desert grasses, low shrubs and sand ridges in the area around Charlotte Waters, near Alice Springs in Central Australia. It weighed 80 grams. The last record is from June 1896. Only two complete specimens were collected, probably from Aboriginal Australians. It was among the largest of all Australian hopping mice recorded in Australia; it was twice as heavy as any living species of hopping mice, although fossils suggest the extinct great hopping mouse may have been a similar size. The short-tailed hopping mouse was predominantly brown in colour, its tail probably being as long as its body. This species' decline was due to a number of factors, some of which were being hunted by predators such as foxes, cats and habitat alterations.

External source
 
 Northern Territory Government, Chris Pavey
[May 2006] Threatened species of Northern Territory

References

Notomys
Extinct rodents
Extinct mammals of Australia
Rodent extinctions since 1500
Extinct mammals of South Australia
Mammals of the Northern Territory
Rodents of Australia
Mammal extinctions since 1500
Mammals described in 1936